The Group of the European Liberal Democrat and Reform Party (ELDR) was a liberal political group of the European Parliament between 1976 and 2004. The group comprised the European Liberal Democrat and Reform Party and its constituent national-level parties, variously of liberal, centrist and agrarian orientation.

Its predecessors have existed since 23 June 1953, then under the name of Liberals and Allies Group. In 1976, the name was changed to Liberal and Democratic Group (LD), and on 13 December 1985 to Liberal and Democratic Reformist Group (LDR). The addition of "Reformist" was a concession to the Social Democratic Party of Portugal, which did not identify as a liberal party.

The ELDR group partnered with the European People's Party – European Democrats (EPP-ED) to form the majority-forming coalition for the 5th Parliament, during which time it elected its sole President of the European Parliament, Pat Cox during the second half of the term.

Following the 2004 European elections the ELDR was expanded and renamed the Alliance of Liberals and Democrats for Europe (ALDE) group.

Chairmen
 1979–1984: Martin Bangemann, Germany (FDP)
 1984–1989: Simone Veil, France (UDF)
 1989–1991: Valéry Giscard d'Estaing, France (UDF-PR)
 1992–1994: Yves Galland, France (UDF-Rad)
 1994–1998: Gijs de Vries, Netherlands (VVD)
 1998–2002: Pat Cox, Ireland (independent)
 2001–2004: Graham Watson, United Kingdom (LibDem)

Presidents of the European Parliament from the Liberal Groups
 1962–1964: Gaetano Martino, Italy (PLI)
 1973–1975: Cornelis Berkhouwer, Netherlands (VVD)
 1979–1982: Simone Veil, France (UDF)
 2002–2004: Pat Cox, Ireland (independent)

Represented parties

References

Former European Parliament party groups
1976 establishments in Europe
2004 disestablishments in the European Union
Alliance of Liberals and Democrats for Europe Party